A Man of Sentiment is a 1933 American pre-Code drama film directed by Richard Thorpe and starring Marian Marsh, Owen Moore and Christian Rub.

Cast
 Marian Marsh as Julia Wilkens
 Owen Moore as Stanley Colton
 Christian Rub as Herman Heupelkossel
 William Bakewell as John Russell
 Emma Dunn as Mrs. John Russell Sr.
 Edmund Breese as John Russell Sr.
 Geneva Mitchell as Doris Russell
 Pat O'Malley as Officer Ryan
 Syd Saylor as Swede - Orderly
 Lucille Ward as Miss Tracy
 Cornelius Keefe as Dr. Jordan
 Otto Hoffman as Landlord
 Matt McHugh as Alex (Willie) Moran - Orderly
 William Bailey as Doctor
 Mildred Washington as Mildred - the Maid

References

Bibliography
 Pitts, Michael R. Poverty Row Studios, 1929-1940. McFarland & Company, 2005.

External links
 

1933 films
1933 drama films
1930s English-language films
American drama films
Films directed by Richard Thorpe
American black-and-white films
Chesterfield Pictures films
1930s American films